Hihi or Hihi Beach is a village and rural community in the Far North District and Northland Region of New Zealand's North Island.

The local Waitetoki Marae is a meeting place for the local Ngāti Kahu hapū of Ngāti Ruaiti. Unlike many other marae, it does not have a meeting house.

Hihi was visited by an American whaling ship in 1792. It became a whaling centre between the 1820s and 1850s.

Butler Point Whaling Museum, located in the village, includes artefacts from American and European whalers, and from Ngāti Kahu.

Demographics
Statistics New Zealand describes Hihi as a rural settlement. Hihi is part of the larger Taemaro-Oruaiti statistical area.

Hihi had a population of 171 at the 2018 New Zealand census, an increase of 15 people (9.6%) since the 2013 census, and an increase of 3 people (1.8%) since the 2006 census. There were 63 households, comprising 93 males and 78 females, giving a sex ratio of 1.19 males per female. The median age was 57.6 years (compared with 37.4 years nationally), with 21 people (12.3%) aged under 15 years, 18 (10.5%) aged 15 to 29, 81 (47.4%) aged 30 to 64, and 54 (31.6%) aged 65 or older.

Ethnicities were 75.4% European/Pākehā, 40.4% Māori, 1.8% Asian, and 1.8% other ethnicities. People may identify with more than one ethnicity.

Of those people who chose to answer the census's question about religious affiliation, 47.4% had no religion, 36.8% were Christian, 1.8% had Māori religious beliefs, 1.8% were Buddhist and 3.5% had other religions.

Of those at least 15 years old, 12 (8.0%) people had a bachelor's or higher degree, and 48 (32.0%) people had no formal qualifications. The median income was $21,000, compared with $31,800 nationally. 9 people (6.0%) earned over $70,000 compared to 17.2% nationally. The employment status of those at least 15 was that 42 (28.0%) people were employed full-time, 15 (10.0%) were part-time, and 9 (6.0%) were unemployed.

References

Far North District
Populated places in the Northland Region